Las Chacras (San Martín) is a village and municipality in San Luis Province in central Argentina.

Demographics

References

Populated places in San Luis Province